Katharina "Kathi" Grompe (born 1 September 1993) is a German retired sprinter who competed at international elite track and field competitions. She is a two-time European champion and World silver medalist in the 4 x 100 metre relay. She was described as one of the greatest talents in German women's sprinting during her sporting career.

Retirement
Grompe retired in 2020 to focus on her career as a self-employed professional athletics coach in Hamburg following her retirement from high-performance athletics. She considered to retire at the age of 27 following reoccurring sport injuries.

References

1993 births
Living people
Sportspeople from Dortmund
German female sprinters